The 1906–07 season was Galatasaray SK's 3rd in existence and the club's 1st in the Istanbul Football League.

Squad statistics

Istanbul Football League

Classification

Matches
Kick-off listed in local time (EEST)

Friendly Matches

References
 Tekil, Süleyman. Dünden bugüne Galatasaray(1983). Page(53). Arset Matbaacılık Kol.Şti.
 Dağlaroğlu, Rüştü.Fenerbahçe Spor Kulübü Tarihi 1907-1957 - The History of Fenerbahçe SK 1907-1957
 Galatasaray. Tercüman Spor Ansiklopedisi Vol. 2 Page (552). Tercüman Yayıncılık ve Matbaacılık AŞ
 1906-1907 İstanbul Futbol Ligi. Türk Futbol Tarihi vol.1. page(29). (June 1992) Türkiye Futbol Federasyonu Yayınları. Original Source: "The Levant Herald Newspaper"
 Şenol, Mehmet. A letter dated November 12, 1906, from Emin Bülent Serdaroğlu to Ali Sami Yen. Galatasaray Magazine, March 2011, page 66-69.
 Şenol, Mehmet. A letter dated December 9, 1906, from Asım Tevfik Sonumut to Ali Sami Yen. Galatasaray Magazine, June–July 2011, page 84.

External links
 Galatasaray Sports Club Official Website 
 Turkish Football Federation - Galatasaray A.Ş. 
 uefa.com - Galatasaray AŞ

Galatasaray S.K. (football) seasons
Turkish football clubs 1906–07 season
1900s in Istanbul